Controlled clinical trial may refer to:

 Clinical trial, the medical research technique
 Contemporary Clinical Trials, the continuation of the discontinued journal Controlled Clinical Trials